The 2010 Montana State Bobcats football team represented Montana State University in the 2010 NCAA Division I FCS football season. The team was led by fourth-year head coach Rob Ash and played its home games at Bobcat Stadium. The team finished the regular season with an 8–3 record, making them Big Sky Conference co-champions alongside Eastern Washington. The team qualified for the NCAA Division I Football Championship playoffs, in which they were eliminated in the second round by the North Dakota State Bison.

Schedule

References

Montana State
Montana State Bobcats football seasons
Big Sky Conference football champion seasons
Montana State
Montana State Bobcats football